Taşyayla is a village in the Bucak District of Burdur Province, Turkey. Its population is 560 (2021). It is 61 km from Burdur and 15 km from Bucak.

Population

References 

Villages in Bucak District